Nina Vaskunlahti is a Finnish diplomat. She has been the Finnish Ambassador to New Delhi since 2016. Prior to that she was a Finnish Ambassador to Ankara between 2012 and 2016. She started working with the Ministry for Foreign Affairs in 1984.

Vaskunlahti has worked as a department head at the East Department of the Ministry for Foreign Affairs and as a Coreper I Ambassador at the Permanent Representation of Finland to the EU.

References

Year of birth missing (living people)
Living people
Ambassadors of Finland to Turkey
Ambassadors of Finland to India
Finnish women ambassadors